The Purépecha (endonym  ) are a group of indigenous people centered in the northwestern region of Michoacán, Mexico, mainly in the area of the cities of Cherán and Pátzcuaro.

They are also known by the pejorative "Tarascan", an exonym, applied by outsiders and not one they use for themselves.

The Purépecha occupied most of Michoacán but also some of the lower valleys of both Guanajuato and Jalisco. Celaya, Acambaro, Cerano, and Yurirapundaro. Now, the Purépecha live mostly in the highlands of central Michoacán, around Lakes Patzcuaro and Cuitzeo.

History

Prehispanic history

It was one of the major empires of the Pre-Columbian era. The capital city was Tzintzuntzan. Purépecha  architecture is noted for step pyramids in the shape of the letter "T". Pre-Columbian Purépecha artisans made feather mosaics that extensively used hummingbird feathers, which were highly regarded as luxury goods throughout the region.

During the Pre-Colonial era, the Purépecha kingdom engaged in conflict with the Aztecs. The Purépecha kingdom expanded through conquest. However, many avoided conquest and bloodshed and, in order to maintain their freedom, exchanged goods and resources such as metal with the Purépecha kingdom.

The Purépecha empire was never conquered by the Aztec Empire, in fact there is no record of the Aztecs ever defeating them in battle. This was most likely due to the presence of metal ores within their empire, and their knowledge of metallurgy, which was far superior to that of the Aztecs ; such skills have persisted in their descendants and are still widely regarded today, particularly their coppersmithing. Even though they were enemies with the Aztecs, the Aztecs still traded with them, mainly for metal tools and weapons.

Spanish era (1525-1821) 

After hearing of the Spanish conquest of the Aztec Empire and having the native population much diminished by an epidemic of smallpox, the cazonci Tangaxuan II pledged his allegiance as a vassal of the King of Spain without a fight in 1525. It is believed that the Spanish conquistador Cristóbal de Olid, upon arriving in the Purépecha Empire, now in present-day Michoacán, explored some parts of Guanajuato in the early 1520s. A legend relates of a 16- or 17-year-old Purépecha, Princess Eréndira, who led her people into a fierce war against the Spanish. Using stolen Spanish horses, her people learned to ride into battle. In 1529 to 1530, the Spanish forces entered Michoacán and some parts of Guanajuato with an army of 500 Spanish soldiers and more than 10,000 Native warriors.

Then, in 1530, the president of the Real Audiencia, Nuño de Guzmán, a conquistador notorious for his ruthlessness and brutality towards the natives, plundered the region and executed Tangaxuan II, destroying the Purépecha State and provoking a chaotic situation and widespread violence. In 1533, the Crown sent an experienced Oidor (Judge of the Audiencia) and later bishop, Don Vasco de Quiroga, who established a lasting colonial rule. The lands of the Purépecha was subjected to serious deforestation during the Spanish Colonial period.

Post-independence history

Cárdenas era

Following the Mexican Revolution (1910-1920), Michoacán experienced political unrest. When former revolutionary general Lázaro Cárdenas, originally from a small town in Michoacán, was appointed governor of his state, he began an ambitious program of reform and economic development, which he continued when he became president of Mexico (1934–40). For him, the indigenous heritage of Michoacán was foundational for the construction of Mexico's post-revolutionary identity. Although the Aztecs loomed large in Mexican history and the construction of identity, Cárdenas saw the Purépecha as "purer" source.  The Purépecha had never been conquered by the Aztecs, but in the era of the Spanish conquest, the resistance of the Purépecha was a point of regional pride.  In particular, Cárdenas promoted the story of Princess Eréndira who is said to have fought against the Spanish. He named the house he built in Pátzcuaro "La Quinta Eréndira" and commissioned muralists to depict Purépecha history in his residence and elsewhere. Purépecha traditions of folkloric performance became a source of indigenista pride.

Out-migration from Michoacán
In the late twentieth and early twenty-first century social scientists have studied Purépecha out-migration from the region.

Religion

Many traditions live on, including the Jimbani Uexurhina (New Fire), which is celebrated on February 2. It has both traditional indigenous and Catholic elements.  The community lights a fire, called the chijpiri jimbani or "new fire," as part of a ceremony that honors the four elements. Mass is also celebrated in the Purhépecha language. They believed in God of the sky, earth, and underworld. The God of the sky and war, Kurikaweri. The Goddess of earth, controlling life and climate, Kweawaperi. The Goddess of the sea and the underworld, Xaratenga.

Culture 
The Purépecha are mainly fishers because they mainly lived around the Patzcuaro lakes. They are also known for their skill in weaving and pottery. Many live in wooden cabins within compounds surrounded by dry-stone walls. However, many of these structures are being replaced with homes made out of brick and concrete.One distinctive practice of the Purépecha include the baptization of newborns after forty days of separate rest for the mother and child. The infant is then swaddled for six weeks and kept in physical contact with the mother or a close female relative. Temples created by Purépecha didn't look like their Mesoamerica counterparts.

Purépecha today celebrates many holidays. One of the most popular holidays celebrated by the Purépecha is the Day Of The Dead or "Día De Los Muertos" . While it is celebrated throughout Mexico in the same way, Purépechans celebrate slightly differently. On November 1st and 2nd, family members take part in all-night vigils at the graves of their loved ones. Purépecha believe that the souls of the dead watch over their living relatives on the Day of the Dead.

In the town of San Juan Nuevo Parangaricutiro, which is a Purépecha town, unmarried men will dance the Dance of the Cúrpites. The dance is used to help the man express their masculinity and court their sweetheart. The dance is celebrated during the Christian holiday of Epiphany.

Language

The Purépecha language  is spoken by nearly 200,000  people in Michoacán. Since Mexico's 2000 indigenous language law, indigenous languages like Purépecha were granted official status equal with Spanish in the areas in which they are spoken. Recently, educational instruction in Purépecha has been introduced in the local school systems. Additionally, many Purépecha communities offer classes and lessons in the language.

In popular culture
Princess Eréndira of the Purépecha was depicted in the 2006 film Erendira Ikikunari (Erendira the Untameable).

The 2017 Disney film, Coco presents a character named “Mama Coco”, who was based on a real Purépecha woman, María Salud Ramírez Caballero. 

The 2022 film, Black Panther: Wakanda Forever, introduces Namor, who’s mythos is rewritten to include an indigenous Meso American background with influences from Mayan and Aztec culture. Tenoch Huerta, who portrays Namor, comes from a Purépecha background.

See also
Pirekua
Pelota purépecha
Purépecha deities
Purépecha Empire
Purépecha language
Purépecha flag

References

Further reading
Anderson, Warren. "P'urépecha migration into the US Rural Midwest: History and current trends." Indigenous Mexican Migrants in the United States, edited by Jonathan Fox and Gaspar Rivera-Salgado, La Jolla: University of California, San Diego, Center for Comparative Immigration Studies/Center for US-Mexican Studies (2004).
Bellamy, K. R. "On the external relations of Purepecha: an investigation into classification, contact and patterns of word formation." Diss. 2018.
Boyd, Maurice. Tarascan myths & legends: a rich and imaginative history of the Tarascans. No. 4. Texas Christian University Press, 1969.
Boyd, Maurice. Eight Tarascan Legends. No. 3. University of Florida, 1958.
Brand, Donald D. "An Historical Sketch of Geography and Anthropology in the Tarascan Region: Part I." New Mexico Anthropologist 6.2 (1943): 37-108.
Bush, Jason W. "Architectural patterning in the Purepecha heartland: An intrasite settlement study at the urban center of Sacapu Angamuco, Michoacán, México." Diss. Colorado State University, 2012.
Carot, Patricia, and Marie-Areti Hers. "Epic of the Toltec Chichimec and the Purepecha in the Ancient Southwest." Archaeology without Borders. Contact, Commerce, and Change in the US Southwest and Northwestern Mexico, Boulder, University Press of Colorado (2008): 301–334.
Chamoreau, Claudine. "Dialectology, typology, diachrony, and contact linguistics: A multi-layered perspective in Purepecha." STUF-Language Typology and Universals Sprachtypologie und Universalienforschung 65.1 (2012): 6-25.
Cohen, Anna S., and Christopher Fisher. "The Tarascan (Purépecha) Empire." The Oxford Handbook of the Aztecs.
Godinez, Isaura. "Migration and Health Outcomes in Purepecha Sending Communities." PhD Diss. The University of North Carolina at Chapel Hill, 2016.
Haskell, David L. "From Tribute to Communal Sovereignty: The Tarascan and Caxcan Territories in Transition." The Canadian Journal of Native Studies 35.2 (2015): 265.
Haskell, David Louis. "History and the construction of hierarchy and ethnicity in the prehispanic Tarascan state: a syntagmatic analysis of the Relación de Michoacán." Diss. University of Florida, 2003.
Hellier-Tinoco, Ruth. Embodying Mexico: Tourism, Nationalism, and Performance. New York: Oxford University Press 2011.
Jolly, Jennifer. Creating Pátzcuaro, Creating Mexico: Art, Tourism, and Nation Building Under Lázaro Cárdenas. Austin: University of Texas Press 2018. 
Kemper, Robert V., and Julie Adkins. "From the" Modern Tarascan Area" to the" Patria Purépecha: Changing Concepts of Ethnic and Regional Identity."." (2006).
Krippner-Martínez, James. "The politics of conquest: An interpretation of the Relación de Michoacán." The Americas 47.2 (1990): 177–197.
Marr, Paul, and Christopher Sutton. "Demographic changes in the Purepecha region of Michoacan, Mexico: 1970-2000." Journal of Latin American Geography (2004): 52–66.
Marr, Paul, and Christopher Sutton. "Impacts of Transportation Changes on the Woodworking Industry of Mexico's Purépecha Region." Geographical Review 94.4 (2004): 440–461.
Pollard, Helen Perlstein. "The construction of ideology in the emergence of the prehispanic Tarascan state." Ancient Mesoamerica 2.2 (1991): 167–179.
Pollard, Helen Perlstein. "A model of the emergence of the Tarascan State." Ancient Mesoamerica 19.2 (2008): 217–230.
Ragone, Agnes, and Paul Marr. "Language maintenance in the Meseta Purépecha region of Michoacán, Mexico." Anthropological linguistics (2006): 109–131.
Ramírez Barreto, Ana Cristina, "'Eréndira a caballo': Acoplamamiento de Cuerpos e historias en un relato de conquista y resistencia."e-misférica: Performance and Politics in the Americas, 2 no. 2 (2005)1-19.
Roskamp, Hans. "Tarascan (P'urhépecha) Empire." The Encyclopedia of Empire (2016): 1–3.
Roth-Seneff, Andrew, Robert V. Kemper, and Julie Adkins, eds. From Tribute to Communal Sovereignty: The Tarascan and Caxcan Territories in Transition. University of Arizona Press, 2016.
Silverstein, Jay E. "A Study of the Late Postclassic Aztec-Tarascan Frontier in Northern Guerrero, Mexico: The Oztuma-Cutzamala Project." (2000).
Thurtell, Joel, and Emily Klancher Merchant. "Gender-Differentiated Tarascan Surnames in Michoacán." Journal of Interdisciplinary History 48.4 (2018): 465–483.

External links
 P'urhépecha WEB Page and Community
 P'urhépecha Literature

 
 
History of Michoacán
Mesoamerican cultures